The Liberal Party of Australia (New South Wales Division), commonly known as the New South Wales Liberals, is the state division of the Liberal Party of Australia in New South Wales. The party currently governs in New South Wales in coalition with the National Party of Australia (NSW). The party is part of the federal Liberal Party which is in opposition nationally. 

Following the Liberal Party's formation in October 1944, the NSW division of the Liberal Party was formed in January 1945. For the following months, the Democratic Party and Liberal Democratic Party joined the Liberal Party and were replaced by the new party's NSW division.

In the 74 years since its foundation the party has won eight state elections to the Labor Party's 13, and has spent 27 years in office (1965 to 1976, 1988 to 1995 and 2011 to the present) to Labor's 46. Eight leaders have become Premier of New South Wales; of those, five, Sir Robert Askin, Nick Greiner, Barry O'Farrell, Mike Baird and Gladys Berejiklian, have won at least one state election.

History

Background

After the 1943 federal election, the Liberal Democratic Party (LDP), United Australia Party (UAP) and Commonwealth Party began discussions on a merger to form a new party, proposed to be also named Democratic Party. The Liberal Democratic Party (NSW) were new parties formed a few months prior in April and May 1943 respectively. By November 1943, discussions were almost completed and unity was likely. The County Party refused to join in the merger but expressed they would co-operate with the new party. However, during the unity conference on 24 November 1943, the LDP walked out of the conference as they were not willing to support retaining the secretary of the UAP, H. W. Horsfield, as the secretary of the new party, as well as retaining members of his staff. Instead, during the same conference, the Commonwealth Party and the New South Wales Democratic Party. As such, LDP remained a separate party to the Democratic Party.

The initial leader of the Democratic Party was the former premier Alexander Mair, but he resigned on 2 February 1944 and was replaced by Reginald Weaver on 10 February.

In the lead up to the 1944 state election in May, the LDP party generated publicity disproportionate to its size and the Sydney Morning Herald commented that the Liberal Democratic Party was "a mouse" attempting to "swallow the Democratic Party lion". At the election, the Democratic Party led by Weaver won 19% of the vote and 12 of the 90 seats in the Legislative Assembly. However, the LDP received less than 4% of the primary vote and did not win a seat.

Horsfield, the secretary of the Democratic Party, resigned on 26 July 1944, paving the way for a LDP-Democratic merger again. In August 1944, the LDP, still led by Ernest White, initially agreed to merge with the Democratic Party and the new party to be known as the United Democratic Party. However, two days after federal UAP leader Robert Menzies announced that he was planning to set up a new "political movement with a Liberal policy" at an October conference, negotiations between LDP and Democratic Party broke down and the party merger did not take place.

Founding of Liberal Party
In October 1944, Menzies founded the Liberal Party of Australia during a conference in Canberra as announced in August, attended by LDP and Democratic Party delegates. The New South Wales division of the Liberal Party was formed on 4 January 1945 with a provisional executive appointed, consisting of 20 LDP and Democratic Party members including White, Weaver and Bill Spooner. Spooner, who was nominated by the LDP, was appointed as the first chairman on 9 January.

The LDP was willing to support the formation of the Liberal Party and dissolved itself on 15 January 1945, officially joining the Liberal Party. The Democratic Party also supported the formation but held off dissolution until a state branch of the Liberal Party had been fully constituted. Weaver and parliamentary members of the Democratic Party were dissatisfied with the Liberal Party executive's attitude towards Democratic Party members and supporters, with Weaver tendering his resignation from the provisional council of the state Liberal Party in February 1945. However, he withdrew his resignation in March 1945, and announced that all Democratic Party parliamentary members would join the Liberal Party.

In the 1945 Ryde state by-election in February, Liberal member Eric Hearnshaw was elected to the New South Wales parliament. As Democratic Party parliamentary members including Weaver at that time had not yet joined the Liberal Party, this made Hearnshaw the first Liberal Party member in the New South Wales parliament. Weaver and other Democratic parliamentary members finally joined the Liberal Party on 20 April 1945, with Weaver becoming the first parliamentary leader of the NSW Liberal Party. On the same day, Albert Reid, independent member for Manly and a former UAP member, also joined the Liberal Party. This brought the total number of Liberal Party legislative assembly members to 14.

Weaver died later in the year in November and he was succeeded by Mair as NSW Liberal Party leader. Mair resigned four months later in March 1946 to contest the Australian Senate, and was succeeded by Vernon Treatt as party leader. Treatt led the Liberal Party opposition in the state parliament for the next eight years.

Present of the Liberal Party
The Liberal/National Coalition won a landslide victory in the 2011 state election, with the Liberal Party winning 51 of the 93 lower house seats, enough for a majority in its own right. Liberal leader Barry O'Farrell opted to retain the Coalition. The coalition has since governed New South Wales under Liberal leaders Mike Baird, Gladys Berejiklian and Dominic Perrottet, the former two winning the 2015 state election and 2019 state election respectively. The 2019 election was significant as it was the first time that the Coalition won a third consecutive term in office in New South Wales since the 1971 state election. It was also the first that a female leader (Gladys Berejiklian) led a party to a state election victory in New South Wales, and the first time a non-Labor female leader won a state election in Australia. She stepped down on 5 October 2021 and was replaced as party leader and Premier by Perrottet.

Preselection procedures
In 2018, the NSW Liberal Party agreed to adopt new rules for preselecting candidates, which were championed by former Prime Minister and incumbent Liberal member of Warringah Tony Abbott and the right wing of the party. The rules, known as Warringah rules, gave local branches the right to hold plebiscites involving all eligible branch members to choose local, state and federal candidates. The party's state executive and the state council would still get 25% of the votes. It was reported that the right faction pushed for the rules as it believed members were more conservative than the state executive which were controlled by moderate members of the party.

2022 federal election

On 30 November 2021, the party was unable to hold its scheduled annual general meeting (AGM) to select members of the state executive due to complications from COVID-19. Minister Alex Hawke, who was the representative of federal party leader and Prime Minister Scott Morrison, also allegedly failed to attend internal Liberal Party nomination review committee meetings.

Not holding an AGM could constitute a breach in the party constitution, which meant that the state executive could not continue in office after 28 February 2022, and this would mean that the federal executive would have to step in to choose New South Wales candidates for 2022 federal election, due in May 2022. The Supreme Court of New South Wales ruled that the state executive could still continue after this date. On 2 March 2022, the state executive tried to fast-track pre-selection plebiscites in seats that did not have candidates finalised, by overriding the constitutional requirements for plebiscites with special powers. However, this did not attain the required 90% state executive support to do so. On 4 March, the federal executive voted to temporarily dissolve the state party and a committee was set up to take over the management of the state party until 8 March, "in accordance with clause 12.3 of the federal constitution of the Liberal Party". The committee, made up of Morrison, Perrottet, and former party president Chris McDiven, had direct control in endorsing candidates without preselection challenges. The committee confirmed the pre-selection of three incumbent federal members of parliament, two of whom were ministers on 8 March. The federal executive also gave the state party until 25 March 2022 to finalise candidates in other federal seats. While the Senate candidates could be finalised, the state party was still unable to do so for a number of seats by 27 March 2022. As a result, on that day, the federal executive voted to temporarily dissolve the state party for the second time and appointed the same Morrison-led committee to preselect candidates in other remaining unfinalised seats until 2 April. Pre-selection ballots intended to be held for these seats in the coming week were all cancelled.

Members who opposed overriding local branch preselection include Sydney businessman Matthew Camenzuli, who was a member of the state executive. , these members have brought the matter to court, seeking to challenge the legitimacy of the committee's preselection of the three incumbent members of parliament on 8 March 2022 and nine other candidates on 2 April 2022. Morrison and Perrottet have urged them to take the matter to the High Court of Australia instead so that the result cannot be appealed further. On 5 April, the New South Wales Court of Appeal ruled that the court had no jurisdiction to make decisions relating to the constitutions of political parties, thereby ruling the preselection of the 12 candidates valid. Camenzuli brought the matter further to High Court for appeal but it was dismissed on 8 April. Camenzuli was also expelled from the party.

Parliamentary party leaders

The position of leader of the Liberal Party of Australia New South Wales Division is a formal role held by a Liberal member of the Parliament of New South Wales. As the Liberal Party has, since its foundation in 1945, been either the largest or second largest party in the New South Wales Legislative Assembly, its leader is usually either the Premier or the Leader of the Opposition, depending on the majority or minority respectively of the party. The current leader of the Liberal Party is Dominic Perrottet, and the deputy leader is Stuart Ayres. Both have served in those roles since 5 October 2021. Perrottet is currently Premier of New South Wales, a post he has also held since 5 October 2021, after Berejiklian announced on 1 October 2021 that she would be resigning from the post as well as from the parliament.

The role is selected by state members of the parliamentary party, but the position is non-fixed in duration, and is usually only vacated upon resignation, retirement from politics, or a spill motion with the support of the majority of the parliamentary members.

The leader only has a role in a parliamentary context; the party division as a whole is governed by a President and Vice-Presidents, who act on the advice of the party division's Director and Deputy Directors. The division also gathers annually at a State Conference to vote on and develop policy to be used by the party's elected representatives. The majority of the twenty Liberal Leaders resigned after losing elections or were deposed by other parliamentary members.

Deputy leaders

Election results

See also

 National Party of Australia – NSW

Notes

References

New South Wales
Political parties in New South Wales
Liberal